Virve may refer to:

Virve (given name), Estonian feminine given name
Virve, Estonia, village in Kuusalu Parish, Harju County, Estonia
VIRVE (Viranomaisradioverkko), Finnish authorities' telecommunications network